Praeornis is a dubious genus of early avialan or bird-like dinosaur, named on the basis of a single feather discovered in the Karabastau Formation of Kazakhstan by Sharov in 1971. A second specimen was discovered in 2010 by Dzik et al. The feathers of Praeornis likely represent modified tail feathers used for display or balance, similar to those found in some other early avialans. The feathers of Praeornis are unique thanks to their extremely thick central quill (rachis) and stiffened barbs.

History 
In 1978, Rautian officially named the feather (cataloged as specimen PIN 2585/32) Praeornis sharovi. He believed it belonged to a bird more primitive than Archaeopteryx, and assigned it to its own subclass (Praeornithes), order (Praeornithiformes) and family (Praeornithidae). However, in 1986, Bock published a paper arguing that the "feather" was in fact the leaf of a cycad. This opinion was followed by Doludenko and colleagues in 1990, who noted that it was similar to the leaves of the cycad species Paracycas harrisii. L.A. Nessov, in 1992, also suggested that it belonged to a cycad, but synonymized it with the species Cycadites saportae. The opinion that it represents a leaf has since been followed by Alan Feduccia in 1996 and Peter Wellnhofer in 2004.

Three studies since the original description have supported the identification of Praeornis as a feather, rather than a leaf. In 1991, Glazunova and colleagues examined the specimen using an electron microscope and found that the microstructure had features in common with the "primitive" feathers of ratite birds [since ratites are now known to be secondarily flightless paleognathous birds, their feathers are not primitive but degenerate flight and contour feathers]. In a 2001 paper, Kurochkin also accepted its identity as a feather. A more comprehensive study was published in 2010 by Dzik et al., in which the authors conducted a biochemical analysis of a Praeornis feather and other fossils from the same site, including plants and fish. The analysis showed that the chemical markers of the Praeornis fossil was more similar to the fish scales than to the plant leaves, supporting the hypothesis that the feathers were animal in origin.  Besides identifying Praeornis as a feather, Dzik et al. also noticed similarities between the purported feathers of Longisquama and those of Praeornis.

In 2017, a fossil of an enantiornith found in Brazil was shown to have a pair of rachis-dominated tail feathers very similar to the type specimen of Praeornis, making it likely that Praeornis represents an enantiornith or similar species.

References

Fossils of Kazakhstan
Prehistoric avialans
Cycads
Bird genera
Jurassic birds